HB Tórshavn women is the women's football team of HB Tórshavn, a Faroese football club, based in Tórshavn and founded in 1904. The club plays in red and black striped shirts. Their stadium, Gundadalur, has a capacity of 4000.

Histgory

The women's was created in 1985 and the team is the second most successful team in the Faroe Islands, being champions seven times, last time in 1999.  Even though it was the club's 100th anniversary in 2004 they had to cancel their team's participation in the competition due to lack of players.

As of 2011 Allan Dybczak was appointed head coach of the HB women's team, along with assistant coach Bogi Højgaard.
The team should have been relegated after the 2011 season where they finished in last position with only five points, but FSF enlarged the league from six to ten teams, and HB Tórshavn stayed in the division for the next season.

Things went better in the 2012 season, with new players arriving, amongst those were current international Heidi Sevdal and former youth international Sára Samuelsen which arrived from Víkingur Gøta women and FC Suðuroy women respectively. These two proved vital to the very successful season, with Samuelsen going on to captain HB Tórshavn, where they ended in fourth place only two points behind league rivals AB Argir, having not lost a single match in the latter half of the season, a large contribution to this feat was the 25 goals that Sevdal managed to score even beating her old all time senior record of 18 goals scored the previous season.

Another notable feat were the two homegrown newcomers to the team Lív F. Arge and Milja R. Simonsen who both debuted the on senior side at the age of only fifteen and playing third most and second most minutes for the team (Samuelsen having played the most minutes). Both Arge and Simonsen were nominated for 1.division Talent of the Year where Arge won.

Honours 
 1. deild kvinnur
 Winners (7): 1986, 1988, 1989, 1993, 1994, 1995 and 1999
 Faroese Women's Cup
 Winners (6): 1990, 1996, 1998, 1999, 2001 and 2019
 Faroese Women's Super Cup
 Winners (1): 2019

Current squad 
As of 4 May 2020.

References

External links

Association football clubs established in 1904
Women's football clubs in the Faroe Islands
1904 establishments in the Faroe Islands
Football clubs in Tórshavn
Sport in Tórshavn